Lucy Martin Lewis (1890/8–March 12, 1992) was a Native American potter from Acoma Pueblo, New Mexico. She is known for her black-on-white decorative ceramics made using traditional techniques.

Biography 
Lucy Martin Lewis was born in Sky City, a mesa in Acoma Pueblo, New Mexico, to Lola Santiago and Martin Ortiz. Though she celebrated her birthday on November 2, her birth year, while unknown, was probably in the 1890s.

Lewis began making pottery at age eight, after studying with her great aunt, Helice Vallo. Both of her parents occasionally worked in the nearby town, Grants. Her early pottery was made for tourists. The ash-bowls were easily made and sold for five or ten cents.

In the late 1910s, Lewis married Toribio 'Haskaya' Luis. The family name was changed to Lewis when the oldest son, Ivan, went into the marines during World War II. She had nine children, seven of which went on to become potters.

Work 
Lewis' daughter, Dolores Lewis Garcia, once noted:"My mother, Lucy M. Lewis, began making pottery at about age seven and attracted public attention for her work in the 1950s...Our family would buy books to look up the old pottery designs and Dr. Kenneth M. Chapman from the Museum of New Mexico suggested to us to use the Mimbres designs and they have become very popular for us today. I was the first to use the Mimbres designs, then my sisters Emma and Mary began to use them. We have helped with publicity for other Acoma potters to bring more attention to the pottery of the Pueblo."Lewis' designs were inspired by Ancestral Puebloans, including the Mimbres designs of the Mogollon as well as the Chacoan culture. Her work began to be recognized in 1950 when she won the a blue ribbon at the annual Gallup Intertribal Ceremonial. After the Gallup prize, Lewis began to sign her work, an act which created controversy within the Pueblo community. Four pieces of her pottery were featured on an episode of Antiques Roadshow and were appraised for between $10,000 to $18,000 for the set.

Lewis's pottery is made from a gray clay body and formed by hand using coils. After the pot is shaped and dried, a white slip is applied. Without the slip the mineral paints would run off the pot. Next, the design is applied using mineral paints and a brush made from yucca. Yucca holds more paint and makes finer lines than regular brushes bought at a store. Finally, on a day when the weather is right for firing, a small number of finished pieces are carefully pit-fired. Results are rarely 100%. Some pieces will end up cracked, the background on others will be gray rather than white (these will need to be re-fired), but a few will be successfully fired.  After going through this process one learns why these pieces should be well taken care of and carefully preserved.

Lewis's pottery featured innovative designs. Lewis was known for the animals, and line designs she drew on her pottery. Her work is influenced by the color of the sky, along with her Native American culture. Lewis was mostly self-taught and her art was natural and innate. Lewis specialized in small pots that were usually six to twelve inches in height. In 1992, the price range for her pottery was listed as between one hundred and several thousand dollars. Lewis's pottery featured innovative designs, and she has been compared to other innovators such as Pablo Picasso and Jackson Pollock. Lewis was known for the animals, and line designs she drew on her pottery. Her work is influenced by the color of the sky, along with her Native American culture. Lewis was mostly self-taught and her art was natural and innate. Lewis specialized in small pots that were usually six to twelve inches in height.

Lewis' tribe, Acoma Pueblo, considered the clay she used for her pottery to be sacred. The creation of a single pot could take as long as two to three weeks. In addition, Native American pottery making is passed down the matriarchal line—mothers, grandmothers, and aunts teach the next generation.

In 1977, Lewis was invited to the White House and in 1983 she received New Mexico's Governor's Award for outstanding personal contribution to the art of the state. Her final art show was the 1991 SWAIA Indian Market in Santa Fe, New Mexico. After a long illness, Lucy M. Lewis died on March 12, 1992, in an Acoma Pueblo hospital.

Lewis's pottery is made from a gray clay body and formed by hand using coils. After the pot is shaped and dried, a white slip is applied, and polished after drying. Without the slip the mineral paints would run off the pot. Designs are applied using mineral paints and a hand-made brush made from yucca. Yucca holds more paint and makes finer lines than store-bought regular brushes. The pots are then pit-fired in small batches. Results are rarely 100%. Some pieces will end up cracked; the pot fragments are used to temper future batches of clay. Some pots will need refiring if the background color is gray rather than white.

Awards
Lewis received awards for her work from the state of New Mexico, the College Arts Association, the American Crafts Council and the Honolulu Academy of Fine Arts.

Notable collections
Her work is in the collections of the Smithsonian Institution and the National Museum of the American Indian, Cooper Hewitt, the Fred Jones Jr. Museum of Art, Lowell D. Holmes Museum of Anthropology, National Museum of Women in the Arts, the University of Michigan Museum of Art, the Haffenreffer Museum of Anthropology at Brown University, and the Spurlock Museum at the University of Illinois at Urbana-Champaign.

References

External links
More Lucy Lewis Information at the Holmes Museum of Anthropology
 Photos of some of Lucy M. Lewis pottery creations
 Image of Susan Peterson with Lucy M. Lewis displaying Lewis' work in Los Angeles, California, 1984. Los Angeles Times Photographic Archive (Collection 1429). UCLA Library Special Collections, Charles E. Young Research Library, University of California, Los Angeles.

Biographies
Lucy M. Lewis: American Indian Potter by Susan Harnly Peterson and Fred Kabotie
A Tribute to Lucy M. Lewis: Acoma Potter by John E. Collins and Dr. Frederick J. Dockstader
Daughters of the Anasazi. John Anthony, Director. Albuquerque, NM.

See also
List of Native American artists
Native American art

1890s births
1992 deaths
Artists from New Mexico
Native American potters
People from Acoma Pueblo
American women ceramists
American ceramists
Pueblo artists
20th-century American women artists
Native American women artists
Women potters
20th-century ceramists
20th-century Native Americans
20th-century Native American women